Jacob de Wit (19 December 1695 – 12 November 1754) was a Dutch artist and interior decorator who painted many religious scenes.

Biography

Jacob de Wit was born in Amsterdam, and became famous for his door and ceiling paintings. He lived on the Keizersgracht in Amsterdam, and many of the buildings on the Keizersgracht still have door or ceiling paintings done by him. Since many of the families who lived in Amsterdam in those days had country villas, de Wit also painted in houses in the fashionable areas of Haarlem and the Vecht river.  

According to the RKD he was the pupil of Albert van Spiers in Amsterdam and Jacob van Hal in Antwerp where he became a member of the Guild of St. Luke in 1714. While in Antwerp, he made a series of watercolor sketches of the Rubens ceilings in the Carolus Borromeuskerk in Antwerp. After the church was struck by lightning in 1718 these became a historical document, and his pupil Jan Punt later engraved his sketches and published them in 1751.
His pupils were Jan de Groot (painter from The Hague), Dionys van Nijmegen, Jan Punt, Pieter Tanjé, and the brothers Frans and Jacob Xavery.
Jacob de Wit died in Amsterdam in 1754. Tako Hajo Jelgersma was his follower.

Major works
Baptism of Christ in the Jordan (1716) – Chalk and pen drawing
Adoration of the Shepherds  (1726) – Oil on canvas
Holy Family and Trinity, also : The Return from Egypt  (1726) – Oil on canvas
Allegory of Transience  (1733) – Oil on canvas
Moses Elects Seventy Elders (1737) – Oil on canvas

Location of paintings
One of his paintings for a door in Heemstede now hangs in Uppsala, Sweden, in the Linnaeus museum.
A set of paintings of the four seasons depicting cherubs painted in a three-dimensional monochrome style now hangs at Hinton Ampner house in Hampshire.
Another of his three-dimensional monochrome style cherub paintings hangs in Kingston Lacy house in Dorset.
Old City Hall (The Hague)
Museum Willet-Holthuysen

References

Jacob de Wit on Artnet

1695 births
1754 deaths
18th-century Dutch painters
18th-century Dutch male artists
Dutch male painters
Dutch Christians
Painters from Amsterdam
Painters from Antwerp